Cusanus Hochschule für Gesellschaftsgestaltung is a private non-profit university situated in Bernkastel-Kues, in the Moselle valley, close to Luxembourg and France. While officially recognised in May 2015 as one of nine universities in the German state of Rhineland-Palatinate, it was founded in February 2014 by a group of academics, students and citizens. One of the institutions involved in the founding of Cusanus Hochschule has been the Kues Academy for the History of European Thought (Kueser Akademie für Europaeische Geistesgeschichte). Cusanus Hochschule remains independent of economic, political and religious interests. Hence, it is not affiliated with any religious denomination. The founding presidium consisted of Harald Spehl (president, professor emeritus Trier University), Silja Graupe (vice-president, professor of economy and philosophy Cusanus Hochschule), Harald Schwaetzer (vice-president) and Frank Vierheilig (managing director of Cusanus Treuhand gGmbH, chancellor of Cusanus Hochschule). The patron saint of Cusanus Hochschule is Nicholas of Cusa, a German philosopher, theologian, jurist and astronomer, who is considered as one of the first German proponents of Renaissance humanism.

History
The idea for the foundation of Cusanus Hochschule initially developed at Kues Academy for the History of European Thought, a network of about 120 academics from the fields of philosophy, economy, the natural sciences, engineering and history. On 12 February 2014 more than 20 academics, politicians and entrepreneurs, together with Kues Academy, endowed Cusanus Hochschule to make it eligible as an officially recognised institution of higher learning. In October 2014, Cusanus Hochschule moved into its new premises, the Renaissance town hall of Bernkastel. Two months later, in December 2014, four courses of study were officially accredited, while the accrediting agency especially praised their high societal relevance. In May 2015, Cusanus Hochschule’s academic licence was granted by the Ministry of Science for Rhineland-Palatinate. The university was officially inaugurated on 26 May 2015. As of 2019 under the new presidency of Reinhard Loske, Cusanus Hochschule focusses entirely on new economic thinking and practice, while maintaining its philosophical inspiration and humanistic ambitions.

Courses of study

Cusanus Hochschule offers a master's course in economics (with an emphasis on the transformation of society and economy) and a corresponding bachelor's degree (with an emphasis on social responsibility). Both courses are meant to broaden the scope of knowledge on economy, culture and society, aiming to allow students and future academics to engage in a reflexive and responsible transformation of both economy and society. Both degrees offer modules in a humanistic tradition (studia humanitatis) that aim at the personal development of students in relation and reflection of their cultural and social contexts. The majority of courses are taught in block seminars, which also enables students to uphold commitments in their home communities while studying. Enrollments in two degrees in philosophy (B.A. and M.A.) seized to be offered as of 2019.

Finance
Cusanus Hochschule and Cusanus Treuhand gGmbH are both non-profit organizations ensuring that research and teaching remain independent. Study fees can be offset by grants, and endowments and donations are the university's only sources of income.

Student community

Students of Cusanus Hochschule founded a non-profit organization in 2014, contributing to the broader context of Cusanus Hochschule with a wide range of activities such as workshops, fundraising, cultural events and student housing. Students have played a significant role in founding, financing and organizing Cusanus Hochschule.

Publications
Members of Cusanus Hochschule contribute to the following publications:

 Kritische Studien zu Markt und Gesellschaft (edited by Silja Graupe, Jakob Kapeller and Walter Ötsch, Metropolis, Marburg).
 International Journal of Pluralism and Economics Education (IJPEE), Inderscience, Genf. Member of the Editorial Board (Silja Graupe)
 Jahrbuch Ökologie, S. Hirzel-Verlag, Co-Editor (Reinhard Loske)

References

External links
 Homepage of Cusanus Hochschule (German)
 Homepage of Student Community (German)

Universities and colleges in Rhineland-Palatinate
2014 establishments in Germany